Charles Deering Estate (also known as Deering Estate at Cutler) was the Florida home of Charles Deering until 1927 when he died at the estate.

Description
Deering lived on the  property for five years, from 1922 to 1927. The property consists of a three-story wooden house built in 1900, known as the Richmond Cottage, and a three-story stone mansion. Other buildings were also built on the property to serve as auxiliary buildings to the estate. Charles Deering Estate is located in the Cutler neighborhood  of Palmetto Bay, Florida.

The grounds include what is thought to be the largest virgin coastal tropical hardwood hammock in the continental United States. The estate was acquired by the state of Florida in 1985.

The estate is owned by the State of Florida and is managed by the Miami-Dade County Parks, Recreation and Open Spaces Department.

After the death of Charles Deering in 1927 the property was maintained by his family. In 1982 after his daughter died the property became available for sale. In 1984 the estate was purchased by Finley Matheson which fought to get it turned into a state park. In 1985 the State of Florida purchased the land for $22.5 million.

The Deering Estate is a national landmark listed on the National Register of Historic Places. It became part of the National Register of Historic places in 1986 by meeting the requirements in all categories. It is also part of the Organization of Biological Field Stations  through its collaboration with Florida International University School of Environment, Arts and Society. By being part of the organization they receive assistance in order to improve their effectiveness in supporting critical  research, education and outreach programs.

For more than 30 years, researchers have studied the unique ecological, geological and archaeological features of the property. The Deering Estate is situated in the only portion of the Everglades Restoration Project within an urban setting and which is easily accessed by the public. In August 2019, the Deering Estate Foundation was granted $200,000 for capital improvements. This will expand the cultural and ecological field station and research site. The funds will provide renovations for a 10,700 square-foot field study research center. The research facility will provide temporary living quarters for up to 14 researchers, a archival library and a field staff office for the Deering Estate and Deering Estate Foundation.  

The house and grounds were featured several times in the 1980s TV series Miami Vice, and the estate was the starting location for The Amazing Race All-Stars in 2007.

History

The Richmond Cottage 

The Richmond Cottage was built by S. Howard Richmond, agent for the Perrine Land Grant Company, as his family home, at the end of the 19th century. An addition which converted the home into a 22-room hotel was completed in 1900. The hotel was managed by Richmond's wife, Edith M. The Richmond Cottage was described as being the "most southerly hotel on the mainland of the United States".

Charles Deering bought the Richmond Cottage in 1916 over the next several years he added different structures to the estate, including a carriage house, pump house and power house. He also enclosed his estate with a limestone and concrete wall and built the boat turning basin in Biscayne Bay. In 1922 he completed his three-story Mediterranean Stone House and moved to Cutler in 1922.

Stone House 
Stone House was designed by Phineas Paist and was completed in 1922. It has 18 inch poured concrete walls, oolitic limestone, coffered ceilings and copper clad and brass doors. After the Great Chicago Fire of 1871, Charles Deering was nervous of what fire could do. He decided to build his Stone House without a stove. There was a kitchen that housed refrigeration cabinets and storage but the cooking was done in the Richmond Cottage. It was his trepidation of fire that had him asking the architect/designer for the 18 inch concrete walls and brass doors. He also added an elevator to the house which was very forward thinking for 1922. The large wine cellar that is located on the first floor was not discovered until after Hurricane Andrew. It was very well hidden behind built-in cabinetry. Hurricane Andrew flooded the first floor and damaged much of it. It was during the clean up process that it was discovered. He intended the house to be used as a showcase for his art collection and books.

Charles Deering 

Charles Deering was born on July 31, 1852, in Paris, Maine. He was the son of William Deering, founder of Deering Harvester Company, and brother of millionaire industrialist James Deering. Deering is remembered as an American businessman and philanthropist.

In 1873 Deering graduated from the United States Naval Academy and served as an officer in the Navy until 1881. Deering then became secretary of his father's company, which merged with McCormick Harvesting Machine Company and became International Harvester in 1902. After the merger, Deering became the chairman of the board for International Harvester.
Charles Deering died at the age of 75 at his estate at Cutler, at 11:30 P.M. on February 5, 1927. After Charles' death, the estate was left to his wife and children.

Cutler Burial Mound
The Cutler Burial Mound is a prehistoric mound on the Charles Deering Estate. It is one of the few surviving prehistoric mounds in Miami-Dade County. The mound is about 38 feet by 20 feet at the base, and about five feet high. Artifacts from the mound are from the Glades II and III periods. The mound has been disturbed repeatedly. Henry Perrine, Jr, son of Henry Perrine, removed several skulls from the mound in the 1860s while searching for Black Caesar's treasure. Ralph Munroe dug in the mound in the 1890s. In the 20th century, neighborhood children dug in the mound and removed bones and artifacts. Some of those bones have been returned and reburied in the mound. The mound is believed to contain 12 to 18 burials of Native Americans. The mound is accessible via a boardwalk.

Cutler Fossil Site

In 1979 a sinkhole on the Deering Estate was found to contain bones of Pleistocene animals associated with bones and artifacts of early humans. The site was eventually acquired by Miami-Dade County, and is now part of the Charles Deering Estate Park.

Hurricane Andrew

On August 24, 1992, Hurricane Andrew struck South Florida as a Category 5 hurricane, the third-strongest tropical cyclone to make landfall in the United States, with winds of 165 mph (270 km/h). Andrew "destroyed 25,524 homes and damaged 101,241 others."

Hurricane Andrew ravaged and damaged the property of Deering Estate. The water front property was devastated by waves that reached as high as the second floor of the buildings. The Richmond Cottage was taken off its foundation and splintered by the hurricane. It took seven years and $7.2 million to restore the location. Deering Estate at Cutler reopened to the public in 1999 and officially opened in 2000.

The Deering Estate Foundation 

The Deering Estate Foundation, Inc., organized in 1989 and strives, "to raise public awareness, outreach, understanding and the enjoyment of the Deering Estate at Cutler and to raise funds to support education, research, exhibits and collections, natural conservation and historical restoration and preservation." The offices of the foundation are located on the third floor of the Richmond Cottage. Is a community based charitable 501(c) Florida Corporation and the philanthropic partners of the Deering Estate.

Gallery

See also 

 Charles Deering
 Deering Harvester Company
 Vizcaya Museum and Gardens

References 

 Florida, DK Eyewitness Travel Guides, 2004, pg. 90

External links 

 Deering Estate at Cutler
 Shade Tree Expert The story of Preserving a Landmark Tree at Deering Estate in Miami

National Register of Historic Places in Miami-Dade County, Florida
Historic house museums in Florida
Museums in Miami-Dade County, Florida
Art museums and galleries in Florida
Houses in Miami-Dade County, Florida